Inova Fairfax Medical Campus is the largest hospital campus in Northern Virginia and the flagship hospital of Inova Health System. Located in Woodburn in Fairfax County, Virginia, Inova Fairfax Hospital is one of the largest employers in the county. Inova Fairfax Hospital is also home to a neonatal intensive care unit, and a dedicated pediatrics intensive care unit, an oncology unit, an adolescent medicine unit, and centers for cardiac surgery and pediatric surgery.

The Inova Fairfax Hospital can be more accurately described as a campus encompassing three hospitals: the Inova Fairfax Hospital proper, which includes the original building, the Inova Children's Hospital, and the Inova Heart and Vascular Institute.

Capability
Inova Fairfax Hospital (IFH) is a 923-bed tertiary care hospital campus providing most medical and surgical specialties and houses Northern Virginia's only Level 1 Trauma Center and the nation's fifth-busiest obstetrics program (with nearly 12,000 live births in 2006). It is one of only six community hospitals in the nation offering the full spectrum of organ transplantation. It has been named among the top 50 hospitals for gastrointestinal disorders, gynecology, and  heart surgery by U.S. News & World Report.

In 2016, Inova Fairfax and University of Virginia Health System announced a partnership involving a $112 million research institute and a University of Virginia School of Medicine regional campus at Inova. The plan involves developing a Global Genomics and Bioinformatics Research Institute at the Inova Center for Personalized Health, which will be funded by UVA, Inova, and the Virginia General Assembly. They also intend to collaborate on research between the Inova Schar Cancer Institute and the University of Virginia Cancer Research Center.
 
Inova Fairfax Hospital is also a satellite clinical campus for students from the University of Virginia School of Medicine and hosts residents from other universities in the area. The hospital also houses the Virginia Commonwealth University School of Pharmacy’s Inova Campus in which students can complete their third and fourth years of training.

Size
The following were statistics at the end of the year ending June 30, 2009:
Admissions: 54,361 
Inpatient surgeries: 19,349 
Outpatient visits: 392,405 
Emergency room visits: 98,317 
Births: 11,182 
Number of beds: 833

Awards
Best Hospitals, U.S. News & World Report: 2021, 2012, 2011, 2010, 2009, 2008, 2007, 2006, 2005, 2004, 2003, 2002, 2001, 2000
Best Hospitals, U.S. News & World Report: 2014 Gynecology Nationally Ranked #19
Best Hospitals, Heart and Heart Surgery, U.S. News & World Report: #21 (2007)
Magnet Nursing Status: American Nurses Association
America's 50 Best Hospitals: 2007-2012 by HealthGrades
50 Best Hospitals in America: February 23, 2011, by Becker's Hospital Review

The hospital has received numerous other awards as well.

Hospital rating data
The HealthGrades website contains the clinical quality data for Inova Fairfax Hospital, as of 2017. For this rating section three different types of data from HealthGrades are presented: clinical quality ratings for thirty-eight inpatient conditions and procedures, thirteen patient safety indicators and the percentage of patients giving the hospital as a 9 or 10 (the two highest possible ratings).

For inpatient conditions and procedures, there are three possible ratings: worse than expected, as expected, better than expected.  For this hospital the data for this category is:
Worse than expected - 5
As expected - 24
Better than expected - 9
For patient safety indicators, there are the same three possible ratings. For this hospital safety indicators were rated as:
Worse than expected - 1
As expected - 10
Better than expected - 2
Percentage of patients rating this hospital as a 9 or 10 - 76%
Percentage of patients who on average rank hospitals as a 9 or 10 - 69%

References

External links 
INOVA Fairfax Hospital | INOVA Health System

Hospital buildings completed in 1961
Hospitals in Virginia
Buildings and structures in Fairfax County, Virginia
Hospitals established in 1961
1961 establishments in Virginia
Trauma centers